Beef is an upcoming comedy drama television series created by Lee Sung Jin for Netflix. It stars Steven Yeun and Ali Wong. It is set to be released on Netflix on April 6, 2023.

Premise
An incident of road rage slowly consumes the two people involved.

Cast

Main
 Steven Yeun as Danny Cho
 Ali Wong as Amy Lau
 David Choe as Isaac
 Young Mazino as Paul
 Joseph Lee as George
 Patti Yasutake as Fumi

Recurring
 Maria Bello as Jordan
 Ashley Park as Naomi
 Justin H. Min as Edwin
 Andrew Santino as Michael
 Rekstizzy as Bobby
 Mia Serafino as Mia
 Remy Holt as June

Guest
 Ione Skye

Episodes

Production
The project, created by Lee Sung Jin and set to star Steven Yeun and Ali Wong was first announced in March 2021, with a bidding war happening over the series rights. Netflix would eventually win the rights. In December, Lee Isaac Chung was reported to be directing the pilot episode. In March 2022, additional castings were announced, including David Choe and Patti Yasutake, and the pilot episode would instead be directed by Japanese director . She was also confirmed to direct several additional episodes.

Filming had begun by April 2022.

The series premiered at the 2023 SXSW Festival on March 18, 2023. It is set to premiere on Netflix on April 6, 2023.

References

External links

Upcoming Netflix original programming
Upcoming comedy television series
Upcoming drama television series
Asian-American television
English-language Netflix original programming
American comedy-drama television series
Television series by Universal Television
Television series by A24